Shield Lake is a small alpine lake located in the Enchantments region of the Alpine Lakes Wilderness in Chelan County, Washington. Shield Lake sits in a bowl formed by a rocky cliff bifurcation of the east skirt of Cannon Mountain that connects to Elf Ridge Peak. Shield Lake has an outflow that is the inflow of Earle Lake and Mesa Lake less than a mile Northeast towards Rat Creek. The creek joins the outflow of Coney Lake, a tributary of Icicle Creek. Coney Lake is situated over the opposite side over Elf Ridge. The lake is home to cutthroat trout and other fish.

See also 
 List of lakes of the Alpine Lakes Wilderness

References 

Lakes of Chelan County, Washington
Lakes of the Alpine Lakes Wilderness
Okanogan National Forest